Right for the Flight is the ninth studio album by American country music singer Eddy Raven. It was released in 1991 by Capitol Records Nashville.

Content
The album included two singles: "Rock Me in the Rhythm of Your Love" and "Too Much Candy for a Dime", which charted at numbers 60 and 58 respectively on the Billboard Hot Country Songs charts in 1991.

Critical reception
Susan Beyer of The Ottawa Citizen gave the album a largely positive review, calling "I Know That Car" a "killer ballad" while also praising the stylistic varieties provided by "Leon and Maggie", "Like a Hurricane", and "Too Much Candy for a Dime".

Track listing
"Rock Me in the Rhythm of Your Love" (Lisa Silver, Robert Earl Keen) - 3:22
"Torn Up" (Tommy Rocco, Austin Roberts, Charlie Black) - 3:00
"Hot Pink" (Tom Paden, Sue Fenton) - 3:26
"I Know That Car" (Chris Waters, Don Henry) - 3:22
"Ain't Nothin' but a Heartache" (Craig Karp, Rob Crosby) - 3:31
"Leon and Maggie" (Raven, Troy Seals) - 2:45
"Like a Hurricane" (Michael Clark) - 3:35
"Too Much Candy for a Dime" (Raven, David Powelson) - 2:57
"Somebody's Tearin' the Flag" (Raven) - 3:45
"Cajun Song" (Danny Rhodes, Jack Rolland, Raven) - 3:43
featuring Doug Kershaw

Personnel
Adapted from Right for the Flight liner notes.

Musicians
Eddie Bayers - drums
Barry Beckett - keyboards
Michael Black - background vocals
Larry Byrom - acoustic guitar
Doug Kershaw - accordion
Jim Horn - saxophone
Mitch Humphries - keyboards
Mike Lawler - synthesizer
Danny Rhodes - acoustic guitar
Michael Rhodes - bass guitar
Bruce Watkins - acoustic guitar
Dennis Wilson - background vocals
Curtis Young - background vocals
Reggie Young - lead guitar, rhythm guitar

Technical
David Bayer - recording assistant
Barry Beckett - producer
Mike Clute - recording
Jeff Coppage - recording assistant
Jim DeMain - recording, recording assistant
Rob Feaster - recording
Pete Greene - recording
Carlos Grier - mastering assistant
Chris Hammond - recording
Scott Hendricks - recording, mixing
John Hurley - recording, recording assistant
Mark Nevers - recording assistant, mixing assistant
Denny Purcell - mastering

References

1991 albums
Capitol Records Nashville albums
Eddy Raven albums
Albums produced by Barry Beckett